The 2021 season was the 109th season of competitive soccer in the United States. A significant number of games scheduled for 2021 are matches postponed from 2020 due to the COVID-19 pandemic.

National teams

Men's

Senior

.

Friendlies

2021 CONCACAF Nations League Finals

Final

2021 CONCACAF Gold Cup

Group B

Knockout stage

Final

2022 FIFA World Cup qualification

CONCACAF Third round

Goalscorers
Goals are current as of December 18, 2021, after the match against .

U–23

CONCACAF Men's Olympic Qualifying Championship

The draw for the tournament took place on 9 January 2020, 19:00 CST (UTC−6), at the Estadio Akron, in Guadalajara, Mexico. On March 13, 2020 CONCACAF suspended all upcoming Concacaf competitions scheduled to take place over the next 30 days.

On 14 January 2021, CONCACAF announced that the Men's Olympic Qualifying will take place between 18 March and 30 March.

Group A

U–20

CONCACAF U-20 Championship

The tournament was originally scheduled to be held in Honduras between 20 June and 5 July 2020. However, on 13 May 2020, CONCACAF announced the decision to postpone the tournament due to the COVID-19 pandemic, with the new dates of the tournament to be confirmed later. CONCACAF decided on 4 January 2021 that the 2020 CONCACAF U-20 Championship, which served as the regional qualifiers, would be cancelled.

Women's

Senior

.

Friendlies

SheBelieves Cup

Summer Olympics

Due to the COVID-19 pandemic, the games have been postponed to the summer of 2021. However, their official name remains 2020 Summer Olympics with the rescheduled 2021 dates have yet to be announced.

Group G

Knockout stage

Goalscorers
Goals are current as of November 30, 2021, after the match against .

U-20

FIFA U-20 Women's World Cup

The tournament was originally scheduled to be held in August/September 2020. However, due to the COVID-19 pandemic, FIFA announced on 3 April 2020 that the tournament would be postponed and rescheduled. On 12 May 2020, FIFA announced that the tournament will be held between 20 January–6 February 2021, subject to further monitoring. On November 17, 2020 tournament was moved to 2022.

Club competitions

Men's

League competitions

Major League Soccer

Conference tables 

 Eastern Conference

 Western Conference

Overall 2021 table 
Note: the table below has no impact on playoff qualification and is used solely for determining host of the MLS Cup, certain CCL spots, the Supporters' Shield trophy, seeding in the 2021 Canadian Championship, and 2022 MLS draft. The conference tables are the sole determinant for teams qualifying for the playoffs.

MLS Playoffs

MLS Cup

MLS All-Star Game

USL Championship 
Renamed from United Soccer League (USL) after the 2018 season

Conference tables 
Eastern Conference

Western Conference

USL League One

National Independent Soccer Association

Spring 2021 

Legends Cup

Conference table

Playoffs

Bold = winner* = after extra time, = penalty shootout scoreSource: Spring Season | National Independent Soccer Association
2020–21 NISA Championship

Fall 2021

Cup competitions

US Open Cup 

On July 20, US Soccer finally announced that the tournament would be cancelled for 2021 and would resume in 2022.

International competitions

CONCACAF competitions

CONCACAF Champions League

teams in bold are still active in the competition

Round of 16

|}

Quarter-finals

|}

Semi-finals

|}

Leagues Cup

teams in bold are still active in the competition.

Quarter-finals

|}

Semi-finals

|}

Final

|}

Campeones Cup

Women's

League competitions

National Women's Soccer League

Regular season

Playoffs

Championship

United Women's Soccer

Cup competitions

NWSL Challenge Cup

Standings

East

West

Final

Honors

Professional

Amateur

References

External links
US Soccer Schedule
US Soccer Results
CONCACAF
MLS
NWSL
USL
USL1

Notes

 
Seasons in American soccer
Soccer